This is a list of the ground forces from Argentina that took part in the Falklands War. For a list of ground forces from the United Kingdom, see British ground forces in the Falklands War.

Operation Rosario (April 2) 

 Amphibious Task Group 40.1 - Rear Admiral of the Marines Carlos Büsser
 Amphibious Commandos Group, on board the destroyer Santisima Trinidad  landed at Mullet Creek south of Stanley, in inflatable boats
 84 men (†one) dubious, more likely 50, too many for a type 42 destroyer plus crew Lieutenant-Commander Sánchez Sabarots.
 Buzos Tácticos, on board the submarine ARA Santa Fe, swam ashore.
 15 frogmen Lieutenant-Commander Alfredo R. Cufré.
 2nd Marine Infantry Btn. (BIM 2),
 embarked on LST ARA Cabo San Antonio (Q42), they landed in 20 LVTP-7 amphibious, armoured, tracked and five LARC-V wheeled vehicles
 and ARA Almirante Irízar (Q-5), inserted on Stanley airport by SH-3 Sea Kings helicopters
 500 men
 A 25th Infantry Regiment Company (Argentine Army) airlifted by C-130

South Georgia (April 3) 

 1st Marine Infantry Btn. (BIM 1) (†two), embarked ARA Bahia Paraiso transport and ARA Guerrico corvette Lieutenant Guillermo J. Luna.
 60 men
 Buzos Tácticos, on board the ship ARA Bahía Paraíso.
 14 frogmen Commander Alfredo Astiz.

Preparations for war 
Argentina had eight complete infantry brigades: 4th Airborne Infantry Brigade in Córdoba; 5th Mountain Brigade in Tucumán; 9th Brigade in the Santa Cruz Province close to the Falklands; the well-equipped 6th and 8th Mountain Infantry Brigades along the Chilean border; 11th Brigade, (cold-adapted) in the extreme south; and 3rd (Jungle) and 7th (Jungle) Brigades facing Brazil and Uruguay. The Argentine Army also had the 10th Mechanized Infantry Brigade in the capital guarding against a theoretical seaborne invasion along the Buenos Aires coastline. Two assumptions governed the deployment of the Argentine ground forces on the islands:
the junta did not believe that the British would use military force to retake the islands, so the initial landing force had been withdrawn shortly after April 3, and was not reinforced until after the British recaptured South Georgia. The intent was to place a large number of troops onto the islands to dissuade the British from any military action. As the Royal Navy had submarines patrolling the immediate area, reinforcements had to be airlifted in, which limited the heavy equipment that could be deployed.
an attack was feared from Chile due to the ongoing Beagle Channel dispute. As Chile was marshalling troops close to its Southern Argentine border, the Argentinian High Command had to deploy their better trained forces to deter a Chilean attack. As a result, neither the mountain warfare regiments, nor the paratroop brigade were available. Furthermore, only a fifth of the cold-adapted marine infantry was sent to the islands. The majority of the troops deployed were from sub-tropical areas, the Argentine Mesopotamia region and Buenos Aires Province, and not trained for action in the terrain (they were trained to avoid snakes and sunstroke, not frostbite). These two incorrect assumptions led to inappropriate troops being sent to the islands.

In the Argentine Army, the bulk of the national servicemen were demobilized in late December. The Soldados Clase ’63 (SC 63) were conscripts born in 1963. On April 2, 1982 the SC 63 inducted into the army in February had started their 45 days of boot camp training. When the Royal Navy set sail for the South Atlantic, the army tried to replace their SC 63 intake with the recently demobilized SC '62 reservists.

The conscripts inducted in February and March 1982 in Lieutenant-Colonel Mohamed Alí Seineldín's 25th Infantry Regiment from the 9th Infantry Brigade in Santa Cruz Province, received Commando training in a crash 4-week course. British Warrant Officer Nick Van Der Bijl, who interviewed key captured Argentine officers in the fighting has written:

In all, some fifty conscripts in the 12th Regiment from the 3rd Infantry Brigade in Corrientes Province had also been put through a compressed commando course organized by visiting Argentine Army Green Berets in 1981. Private Esteban Roberto Ávalos who fought in the Falklands as a sniper recalls:

During 1981, a Commando course was squeezed in the 10th Mechanised Infantry Brigade in Buenos Aires. The brigade commander, Brigadier Oscar Luis Jofré had decided that an airlanding special operations platoon would be formed for each of his regiments. Major Oscar Ramón Jaimet, the Operations Officer of the 6th Regiment, took over command of the formation of these helicopter-borne platoons of mainly conscripts. Jaimet, a dedicated professional soldier had served behind Marxist separatist guerrilla lines as a Commando in the Tucumán Province in 1975. Private Santiago Fabián Gauto was selected to be part of the Commando platoon for the 7th Regiment:

Major Carlos Carrizo Salvadores, second-in-command of the 7th Regiment confirms that:

Theatre of Operations in the Falkland Islands (April 7 – June 14) 

Guarnición Militar Malvinas
 Commander: Brigade General Mario Menéndez (governor). RI (Infantry Regiments) were about 800 men.

With regards to the number of night-vision rifle-scopes and head-mounted goggles that the Argentine Army and Marines had for the coming battles, it was later established that contacts in the United States had managed to find a firm that agreed to sell 100 night vision scopes and 100 pairs of night vision goggles, all this under the very noses of the various US intelligence agencies and they were sent to the Falkland Islands before the start of the ground battles. Rear-Admiral Edgardo Otero from the Malvinas Joint Command, who commanded the Marines deployed in Stanley and Pebble Island, received these sophisticated items of equipment and ordered that the Marines were to keep half of them and the other half would be distributed among the various Argentinian Army units
With regards to the number of night vision rifle scopes and head-mounted goggles that Battle Group Puerto Argentino had for the coming battles, it was later established that contacts in the United States had managed to find a firm that agreed to sell 100 night vision scopes and 100 pairs of night vision goggles, all this under the very noses of the various US intelligence agencies and they were sent to the Falkland Islands before the start of the ground battles. Rear-Admiral Edgardo Otero from the Malvinas Joint Command, who commanded the Marines deployed in Stanley and Pebble Island, received these sophisticated items of equipment and ordered that the Marines were to keep half of them and the other half would be distributed among the various Argentinian Army units

3rd (Jungle) Infantry Brigade 
It was on 2 April 1982 when Brigadier-General Omar Edgardo Parada learned that the Falklands/Malvinas had been occupied. This brigade commander did not have much time to take part in the official celebrations held in the capital city of Corrientes Province; he soon received  orders to prepare his brigade for transfer to southern Argentina, with one of his units, the 3rd Artillery Regiment ordered to Port Stanley. At this juncture most of the 3rd Brigade conscripts had completed their national service and had returned to civilian life, and the new batch of conscripts had just been incorporated. Parada immediately went about the task of rounding up all the reservists, which he was able to achieve in great numbers by sending messengers in vehicles. Thus a substantial part of the trained reservists from the provinces of Corrientes, Chaco, and Misiones, were mobilized, many of the recalled soldiers scrambling aboard the trains laden with the brigade's regulars on their southbound journey. After crossing the Colorado River, Parada received new instructions to reinforce Brigadier-General Américo Daher's 9th Infantry Brigade in Santa Cruz Province that had already sent the 8th and 25th Regiments to the Falklands. Before this request could be met, the 3rd Brigade received orders to board the transport planes heading to Port Stanley.

Private Pablo Vicente Córdoba from the new arrivals (Soldados Clase '63) in the 4th Infantry Regiment recalls the accelerated boot-camp training he received under Sub-Lieutenant Oscar Augusto Silva (Killed in action on Mount Tumbledown):

Commander: Brigade General Omar Parada. Brigade home base: Mesopotamia
 4th Regiment (RI 4) — Mount Harriet and Two Sisters (Stanley) (†23 and 121 wounded )
 Commander: Lieutenant-Colonel Diego A. Soria.
 12th Regiment (RI 12) — Goose Green and Darwin (East Falkland) (†35 and 72 wounded )
 Commander: Lieutenant-Colonel Italo A. Piaggi.
 West Falkland
 5th Regiment (RI 5) — Port Howard (†8 and 67 wounded )
 Commander: Colonel Juan R. Mabragaña
 8th Regiment, 9th Infantry Brigade (RI 8) — Fox Bay  (†5 and 51 wounded )
 Commander: Lieutenant-Colonel Ernesto A. Repossi.

Private Dacio Agretti, serving in C Company from the 4th Infantry Regiment, recalls events leading up to the Battle of Two Sisters:

During the Battle of Mount Harriet, 42 Commando Group discovered a path through a  frozen minefield, according to the 4th Regiment's Intelligence Officer First Lieutenant Jorge Echeverría, allowing the Royal Marines to attack the two Argentine 4th Regiment companies on Harriet from the rear. The British marines were in among the 120mm heavy mortar platoon (under Second Lieutenant Mario Hector Juárez) and 12th Regiment reserve platoon (under Second Lieutenant Celestino Mosteirin) positions very early in the battle, and they took the position after a 15-minute gun-fight and scattered the defenders. The 12th Regiment company commander present, First Lieutenant Ignacio Gorriti and First Lieutenant Jorge Echeverría tried to pull troops from Mosteirin's reinforced rifle platoon to counterattack the British, but many of the soldiers initially refused to obey any commands to stand and fight. A 4th Regiment B Company platoon commander, Second Lieutenant Eugenio César Bruny, managed to pull together his rifle platoon for a counterattack but it was pinned and dispersed almost immediately by British artillery and mortar fire.

9th Infantry Brigade 
Lieutenant-Colonel Mohamed Alí Seineldín's 25th Infantry Regiment (Regimiento de Infantería 25 or RI 25) was part of Brigadier-General Américo Daher's 9th Infantry Brigade (Brigada de Infantería IX or Br I IX), and based in Colonia de Sarmiento in the Chubut Province as part of 5th Army Corps. At the time the regiment consisted of two rifle companies and a Headquarters & Support Company.
Under the influence of 'Halcón 8' instructors, Special Forces techniques were implemented. The regiment was unofficially named Regimiento de Infantería 'Especial' 25. RI 25 were overjoyed to be selected to take part in Operation Rosario, and a third company was formed followed by a fourth and fifth company comprising reservists that had completed their training in 1981

The 181st Armoured Cavalry Exploration Detachment (Destacamento de Exploración de Caballería Blindado 181 or Dest  Expl C Bl 10) was an armoured car unit based in Esquel, Chubut Province. Equipped with 8 French-built Panhard AML-90 armoured cars under Second Lieutenants Fernando Pedro Chércoles and Gustavo Adolfo Tamaño, it was deployed to the Falklands on 9 April.

The armoured car unit was soon joined by the two other Panhards from the 10th Armoured Cavalry Exploration Squadron from the 10th Brigade.

Lieutenant-Colonel Ernesto Alejandro Repossi, Commanding Officer of the 8th Infantry Regiment (Regimiento de Infantería 8 or RI 8) received orders from Colonel Horacio Chimeno (second-in-command of the 9th Brigade) on 5 April to get his unit ready for deployment in the Falklands with RI 8 arriving in Stanley Airbase on 8 April.

The regiment soon joined the 9th Engineer Company (Ca Ing 9) in Fox Bay between 9 and 16 April.

Before their arrival in the Falklands, Lieutenant-Colonel Ernesto Alejandro Repossi had purchased in Comodoro Rivadavia rain boots for his men and the supporting engineers from Ca Ing 9, after learning from Major Lima (Officer Commanding 9th Engineer Company at Fox Bay) of the wet terrain and the fact that the locals civilians went                         about their day in Wellington boots, a decision he claimed saved his men from suffering from trenchfoot.

10th Mechanised Infantry Brigade 
Agrupación Puerto Argentino (Stanley Sector)Commander: Brigadier-General Oscar Luis Jofre. Brigade home base: Buenos Aires Province

Brigadier Jofre, aged 53, had converted his 10th Brigade into a well-trained formation. The culmination of the training cycle for the conscripts consisted of a full-scale mechanized infantry assault with supporting aircraft from the Argentine Air Force in the General Acha Desert in La Pampa Province in October 1981. Private Claudio Alberto Carbone from the 7th Mechanized Regiment recalls the major exercise that also involved the 1st Armoured Cavalry Brigade:

In an interview with Private Manuel Valenzuela from the 6th Mechanized Regiment in 2015, the Argentine newspaper Publicable confirmed that the exercises in the General Acha training area (716 kilometres north of Buenos Aires) were designed to toughen up the conscripts nearing the completion of their national service, with very little food and water provided to the participating units in the first burst of heatwave conditions in the Argentine summer of 1981:

The 10th Brigade mobilized with creditable speed. The Argentine reservists were sustained by patriotism and indignation. Private Patricio Pérez from the 3rd Regiment:

Private Horacio Benítez from the 3rd Regiment:

The 10th Brigade assumed responsibility for the defence of Port Stanley with Moody Brook Barracks initially serving as the 10th Mechanized Infantry Brigade Headquarters."EL ESCALÓN AVANZADO DE LA COMPAÑÍA 601 pasó su primera noche en Malvinas precariamente instalado en los altillos de Moody Brook, antiguo cuartel de los Royal Marines, en donde funcionaba el puesto de mando de la Brigada de Infantería X y en el cual se encontraron con los barbudos y cansados jefes de Regimiento que habían llegado desde la primera línea para reforzar la defensa de Puerto Argentino." Comandos en acción: el Ejército en Malvinas, Isidoro Ruiz Moreno, p. 23, Emecé Editores, 1986
 3rd Regiment (RI 3) — Stanley - aborted urban warfare (†five and 85 wounded )
 Commander: Lieutenant-Colonel David Ubaldo Comini.
 6th Regiment (RI 6) — Stanley Common (†12 and 35 wounded )
 Commander: Lieutenant-Colonel Jorge Halperin.
 7th Regiment (RI 7) — Mount Longdon and Wireless Ridge (Stanley) (†36 and 152 wounded )
 Commander: Lieutenant-Colonel Omar Giménez.
 25th Infantry Regiment (Argentina) (RI 25), 9th Infantry Brigade (attach to 10th Brigade) — Stanley Airport, Goose Green and San Carlos (†13 and 67 wounded )
 Commander: Lieutenant-Colonel Mohamed Ali Seineldin.
 Panhard Armoured Cars Squadron (Esc Panhard/Destacamento de Exploración de Caballería Blindada 181), 9th Infantry Brigade (attached to 10th Infantry Brigade) - Moody Brook
 Commander: Major Alejandro David Carullo.
 12×Panhard Armoured Car 90 mm.
 10th Armoured Cavalry Reconnaissance Squadron (dismounted), 10th Infantry Brigade (attached to reserve) - Moody Brook (†six and 68 wounded )
 Commander: Captain Rodrigo Alejandro Soloaga.

The first elements of the La Tablada-based 3rd Mechanized Infantry Regiment arrived in Port Stanley on 9 April and from 13-21 would spend their time digging in Sector Cobre (Copper) covering the southern beaches. The Commanding Officer of the 3rd Regiment, Lieutenant-Colonel David Ubaldo Comini attended his first briefing inside the ex-Royal Marine Barracks on 10 April with Comini that night giving a patriotic speech in the presence of Brigadier-General Mario Benjamin Menéndez that welcomed the new arrivals with a giant chocolate easter egg and bottles of French wine seized from the Royal Marine cellars, a televised event that Argentine war correspondent Eduardo Rotondo captured on film.

The 3rd Infantry Regiment from the La Tablada suburb of Buenos Aires, was allocated two warehouses in Port Stanley for the drying of wet clothes left hanging inside and to get some proper sleep, 200 men per night; this luxury of course ended, with the British San Carlos landings and an increase of British air activity and naval shelling.

On the night of 12–13 June, Captain Rubén Oscar Zunino's A Company from the 3rd Regiment was detached to 'Reserva Z' ready to reinforce Commander Carlos Hugo Robacio's 5th Marine Battalion or Lieutenant-Colonel Omar Giménez's 7th Regiment. Robacio did not use the company but Giménez called for it to regain Wireless Ridge; this attack failed in spite of a determined effort. The platoons involved withdrew under covering fire from the Oto Melara 105mm pack howitzers from the 4th Airborne Artillery Group.

During its defence of Port Stanley, the 10th Brigade had suffered 66 killed and 370 wounded.

 Artillery 
 3rd Artillery Group (GA 3), 3rd Infantry Brigade (†two and 21 wounded)
 Commander: Lieutenant-Colonel Martín A. Balza
 18 OTO Melara Mod 56 105 mm field guns (Stanley and Goose Green).
 2 x CITER 155mm L33 Guns airlifted from May 15 (from the 101st Artillery Group) (Stanley).
 4th Airborne Artillery Group (GA Aerot 4), 4th Airborne Brigade (†3 and 42 wounded) (Stanley).
 Commander: Lieutenant-Colonel Carlos Alberto Quevedo
 18 x 105 mm guns.

 Miscellaneous Army Units 
I Corps
 181st Military Police and Intelligence Coy (Stanley).
Army Chief of Staff Troops
 601st Engineer battalion (BI-601) (†one and 10 wounded ) (Fitz Roy bridge demolition)
 Commander: Major Jorge L. A. Etienot.
 9th Engineer company
 Commander: Major Oscar M. Lima.
 10th Engineer company (†one and five wounded )
 Commander: Major Carlos R. Matalon.
 601 Commando Company Port Howard and Murrell River
 Commander: Major Mario Castagneto
 602nd Commando CompanyMount Kent and Murrell River(†five and seven wounded )
 Commander: Major Aldo Rico.
 601 Combat Aviation Battalion (Batallón de Aviación de Combate 601) See 601 Assault Helicopter Battalion

Under the orders of Brigadier-General Menéndez, the Argentine Military Governor at Port Stanley, the army engineers (under Colonel Manuel Dorrego) in the Falklands capital built field showers for the 10th Brigade, that allowed the 3rd, 6th, 7th and supporting 4th and 25th Regiments before the British landings, to send companies into town on a rotating basis to get a hot shower.

 'Reserva Z' Reserva Z (Z Reserve) was established on 7 April 1982. Initially comprising Major  Alejandro Carullo's 181st Armoured Cavalry Squadron, it was located on Stanley Racecourse with orders to reinforce Fox Bay or Goose Green if required via helicopters or ships.

 181st Armoured Car Squadron (Stanley Racecourse).
 10th Armoured Squadron (Moody Valley).
 6th Regiment's 'Piribebuy' Company (The Saddle).
 Commander: First Lieutenant Raúl Daniel Abella.
 3rd Regiment's 'Tacuari' Company
 Commander: Captain Rubén Oscar Zunino.

With the arrival of the 10th Brigade, 'Reserva Z' was reinforced by Captain Rodrigo Alejandro Soloaga's 10th Armoured Cavalry Squadron and the 3rd Regiment's 'Tacuari'  Company and the 6th Infantry Regiment's 'Piribebuy' Company. By the end of April, 'Reserva Z' received clear instructions to defend the Stanley sector. The two armoured car units were ordered to patrol the Stanley-Estancia track. The 6th Regiment's B Company occupied The Saddle in support of the 4th 'Monte Caseros' Regiment digging in on Mount Challenger and Wall Mountain. It was also warned to be ready to reinforce the 3rd and 6th Infantry Regiments in the event of a seaborne landing on the southern beaches. In late April, 'Equipo de Combate Solari' in the form of the 12th Infantry Regiment's B Company joined 'Reserva Z', bringing it to a regimental-size grouping.

 Marines 
 5th Marine Infantry Btn. (BIM 5) attached to Army — Mount Tumbledown, Mount William and Sapper Hill (Stanley) (†16 and 68 wounded)
 Commander: Capitan de Fragata (commander) Carlos Hugo Robacio.
 Heavy Machine-Gun Company; 27 x 12.7 mm MGs
 Commander: Teniente de Navio (Marine Captain) Sergio Dachary. Stanley Common (†seven and 17 wounded )
 Amphibious Engineer Company Stanley Common (†four)
 Commander: Capitan de Corbeta Luis A. Menghini
1st Marine Field Artillery Battalion's B Battery (Batería B/BlAC) Stanley Common (†two and two wounded)
 Commander: Teniente de Navio Mario R. Abadal
 1,800 men
 Dog platoon Naval Base Puerto Belgrano Teniente de fragata Miguel A. Paz  
 18 dogs (†two), 22 men

On the night of 13–14 June, the British 5th Infantry Brigade carried out their attacks. The 2nd Scots Guards Battalion attacked Tumbledown Mountain in the centre. The Argentines defending Tumbledown were Marines from N Company from Commander Carlos Hugo Robacio's 5th Marine Battalion. They were supported on the forward slopes of Mount William with O Company of the 5th Marines. Although its men were conscripts too, the marines were well fed and well clothed for the Falklands. The battalion had been based in Tierra del Fuego in the far south of the Patagonia and the soldiers were used to the harsh terrain and cold climate.

 Gendarmería (Border Guards)  Escuadrón de Fuerzas Especiales 601 de Gendarmería Nacional
The following Gendarmeria combat patrols in the form of the 601st National Gendarmerie Special Forces Squadron operated in the Falklands:
Special Forces Combat Patrols: (†seven)  6 died and 11 injured in the Puma helicopter crash on 30 MayAtucha Squad - Mount Kent (East Falkland).Bariloche Squad.Calafate Squad.Esquel Squad - Smoko Mount (East Falkland).

The 601st National Gendarmerie Special Forces Squadron under Major José Ricardo Spadaro along with the 181st Military Police Company carried out several cordon-and-search operations in Port Stanley, to ensure that British special forces were not hiding among the civilian population in the Falklands capital. Port Stanley resident John Smith recalls the surprise inspection his family received on the night of 9–10 June from the Gendarmerie commando patrol squad under Captain Hugo Díaz:

 Air defences 

 Army 
601st Air Defence Artillery Group (GADA-601). (†six and 23 wounded ) 4 by Shrike 3rd June
 Commander: Lieutenant-Colonel Héctor L. Arias
 Cardion AN/TPS-44 long range radar
 Roland SAM system
 4 x Tigercat SAM triple launchers
 6 x Skyguard fire control radars, each controlling 2 Oerlikon GDF-002 35 mm twin cannons. (One Skyguard radar and two GDF-002 35 mm twin cannons deployed to BAM Cóndor/Goose Green.)
 12 x GDF-002 35 mm twin cannons for the Argentine Army. 3 x GDF-002 35 mm twin cannons for the (FAA) Air Force. The FAA Oerlikon GDF-002 guns were sited on the Southwest side of Port Stanley Airport.
 3 x Oerlikon 20 mm single barrel Anti-Aircraft Cannons.
B Battery, 101st Anti-Aircraft group (GADA 101), I Corps.(†three and nine wounded )
 Commander: Major Jorge Monge.
 8 x Hispano Suiza 30 mm guns.
 10 x 12.7 mm machine guns.
Some Infantry units
 Blowpipe shoulder fired SAMs.

 Air Force 

 Stanley Airfield defence group
 Goose Green Airfield defence group (BAM Cóndor)
 Special Operations Group:
 Westinghouse TPS-43F long range radar
 3 x Oerlikon twin 35 mm guns
 Super Fledermaus fire control radar
 Elta short ranged radar at Goose Green
 15 x Rheinmetall Rh-202 twin 20 mm anti-aircraft guns (9 deployed to defend Port Stanley Airbase, 6 deployed to defend Goose Green Airbase)
 A number of SA-7 man portable short ranged SAMs.

 Navy 
 1st Marine Anti-Aircraft Battalion Stanley Common (†2).
 Commander: capitan de corbeta (Marine Major) Hector E. Silva .
 3 x Tigercat SAM triple launchers
 12 x Hispano HS-831 30 mm anti-aircraft guns

 Infantry weapons 

 Personal Weapons
 Browning Hi-Power
 Ballester–Molina
 FM PA3-DM
 FMK-3 submachine gun
 L34A1 Sterling
 FM FAL 50.61
 FM FAL 50.41
 M16A1, "partially used"
 Support Weapons
 FM FAP
 FM MAG
 Browning M2HB
 90mm M20 Bazooka
 FM 60 mm Mortar
 FM 81 mm Mortar
 FM 120 mm Mortar
 FM Model 1968/M-1974 105mm recoilless gun
 Blowpipe MANPADS (Man Portable Air-Defence System)
 Anti-personnel mines
 FMK1 (mine)
 No. 4
 P4B
 SB33
 Anti-tank mines
 C3B
 FMK3
 M1
 No. 6
 SB81

 Casualties 
Argentine Army: 194 (16 officers, 35 NCOs and 143 conscripts) killed and 1,308 wounded
list Argentine Army casualties
Argentine Navy : 34 Marines killed (one officer, three NCOs and 30 conscripts) and 105 wounded
Gendarmería Nacional Argentina: seven commandos (two officers, four NCOs and one gendarme) killed and 12 wounded or injured.

See also
Argentine air forces in the Falklands War
Argentine naval forces in the Falklands War

 References 

 Notes 

 Sources 
 The Battle For The Falklands, Max Hastings and Simon Jenkins, 
 Falklands Air War, Chris Hobson, 
 The Falklands War 1982'', Duncan Anderson, 
  Argentine Order of Battle

External links 
 Argentine Defences on the Falklands

Falklands War orders of battle